A Western is a genre that takes place in the Old West and involves cowboys, cattle ranchers, miners, farmers, Native Americans, Spaniards, swords, guns and horses. It was among the most popular genres of television in the 1950s and 1960s, when several hundred were aired.

List

See also
Western (genre)
Westerns on television
List of Contemporary Westerns

External links
 TV Westerns, listings for 200 Western shows

Western
Western (genre) television series